Khaled Abdel Rahman (1 June 1957 – 11 April 2015) was an Egyptian volleyball player. He competed in the 1984 Summer Olympics.

References

1957 births
2015 deaths
Volleyball players at the 1984 Summer Olympics
Egyptian men's volleyball players
Olympic volleyball players of Egypt